The NASCAR Whelen Modified Tour (NWMT) (previously the NASCAR Winston Modified Tour and NASCAR Featherlite Modified Series from 1985 until 2005) is a modified stock car racing series owned and operated by NASCAR in the Modified Division.  The Modified Division is NASCAR's oldest division, and is the only open-wheeled division that NASCAR sanctions. NASCAR Whelen Modified Tour events are mainly held in the northeastern United States, but the 2007 and 2008 tours expanded to the Midwest with the addition of a race in Mansfield, Ohio. The tour races primarily on short oval paved tracks, but the NWMT also has made appearances at larger ovals and road courses.

History

Modified Division (1947–1984)
The NASCAR Modified Division was formed as part of NASCAR's creation in December 1947.  NASCAR held a modified race as its first sanctioned event, on February 15, 1948, on the beach course at Daytona Beach, Florida. Red Byron won the event and 11 more races that year, and won the first NASCAR Modified Championship.
(The Strictly Stock Division, which evolved into today's premier Cup Series, did not race until 1949.)  Post-World War II modifieds were a form of "stock car" (contrasted against purpose-built AAA championship cars, sprints, and midgets) which allowed some modification, typically substitution of stronger truck parts.  Most cars were pre-WWII coupes and coaches.  This pattern continued through the 1960s, with aftermarket performance parts and later-model chassis (such as the 1955–57 Chevrolet's frame) becoming more common.  Modifieds became known for technical innovation, both in homebuilt parts and in adapting components from other types of vehicles.  By 1970, many modifieds featured big-block engines, fuel injection, eighteen-inch-wide rear tires, radically offset engine locations, and other technologies that made them faster on short tracks than any full-bodied race cars including Grand National cars.

The predecessor to the NASCAR Whelen Modified Tour was NASCAR's National Modified Championship, which was determined by total points from weekly NASCAR-sanctioned races as well as a schedule of national championship races.  Parts of the northeastern and southeastern US were hotbeds of modified racing in the 1950s and 1960s; some racers competed five nights per week or more.  Often the same car was raced on both dirt and paved tracks, changing only tires and perhaps springs and shock absorbers.  In the late 1960s and early 1970s, the technology of dirt and pavement modifieds diverged to make them separate types of race car.  NASCAR was no longer sanctioning dirt tracks which held modified races, so the NASCAR modified rules became the standard for asphalt Modifieds.  (Starting in the early 1970s, northeastern US dirt modified racetracks began to join the DIRT organization founded by Glenn Donnelly.)  Most unsanctioned tracks used similar modified rules to NASCAR's, or specified the same cars with cost-limiting rules such as smaller engines or narrow tires.

In the 1980s, it became prohibitively expensive for modified teams to tow long distances to sixty or more races per year, including Watkins Glen International and Daytona International Speedway, Bowman Gray Stadium in Winston-Salem, North Carolina, North Wilkesboro Speedway, and Martinsville Speedway, with the North Wilkesboro races part of the Cup weekend. To enable more than a few teams to contend seriously for the championship, it was decided to reformat the Modified Division's championship to a limited schedule of races not conflicting with one another.  This change mirrored similar format changes to the Grand National Division starting in 1972 and the Late Model Sportsman Division (now Xfinity Series) starting in 1982. Richie Evans ran 66 NASCAR modified features (and several unsanctioned events such as the Race of Champions) in 1984, the final year of the old system.

Whelen Modified Tour (1985–present)

The modern-day NASCAR Whelen Modified Tour was first held in 1985 with 29 races, named the "NASCAR Winston Modified Tour".  It switched sponsorship to the Featherlite Trailers brand in 1994, and was renamed the "NASCAR Featherlite Modified Series".

Two major changes to the NASCAR Whelen Modified Tour came in 2005.

In 2005, Whelen Engineering took over sponsorship of the series, which was renamed the "NASCAR Whelen Modified Tour".

Beginning in 2005 NASCAR sanctioned a new modified division in the southeastern United States known as the Whelen Southern Modified Tour. The two tours agreed to run a combined race at Martinsville Speedway.

1985 
Richie Evans, the first NASCAR national touring division driver to capture nine national championships is tied with Mike Stefanik for the most NASCAR championships in the Modifieds, won his last championship posthumously in 1985, the first year of the Winston Modified Tour.  Driving his own designed and built cars and maintained in his own shop in Rome, NY for sponsor concrete magnate B.R. DeWitt, Evans won 12 of his 28 starts on the tour, including five consecutive victories at five tracks in July and August. Billy Nacewicz was the team's crew chief.  Other strong contenders on the tour included Stefanik, George Kent, Jimmy Spencer, Brian Ross, Reggie Ruggiero, Brett Bodine, Charlie Jarzombek, Jeff Fuller, George Brunnhoelzl, Doug Heveron, Jamie Tomaino, John Rosati, Corky Cookman, Greg Sacks, Mike McLaughlin, and Bugs Stevens. Many other top racers focused on their local tracks but ran limited tour schedules.  In October, the season ended in tragedy when Evans was killed in an accident while practicing for the final race of the tour season, the Winn-Dixie 500 at Martinsville Speedway.  He had already clinched the title; Mike McLaughlin, driving for Len Boehler, finished second in the points standings.

2017 
Following the 2016 season, the NASCAR Whelen Southern Modified Tour ceased operation and was merged with the Whelen Modified Tour. For 2017, Bristol and Charlotte were brought over in the merger and Myrtle Beach was added to start the season. During the 2017 season, Ted Christopher died in a plane crash near North Branford on September 16 enroute to race at a tour event that night at Riverhead Raceway. The car owner later dropped out of the event and Christopher was credited with a Did Not Start and last place position. Cristopher was honored during the next race held at New Hampshire with a decal displayed on the cars and with Woody Pitkat driving Ted Christopher's modified. Stafford Motor Speedway retired his number 13 from its weekly modified racing.

2018 
The NASCAR Cup Series and Truck Series dropped a race at New Hampshire Motor Speedway in favor of Las Vegas. New Hampshire replaced the series with the "Full Throttle Weekend", with the NASCAR Whelen Modified Tour Musket 250. It became the longest race on the tour (250 laps). The weekend also featured the NASCAR K&N Pro Series East with the Apple Barrel 125 (which featured a driver from the Euro series and another from the Mexico series, and, for the first time since its formation in 2007, a NASCAR Pinty's Series race outside of Canada (the Granite 100).

2019 
For 2019, the tour went back to South Boston for the first time since the merger of the northern tour and the southern tour.

Beginning with 2019, all NASCAR modified events will be live on Fanschoice.tv.

2020 
	
The 2020 season was one of constant change, as the planned season was temporarily put on hold due to the COVID-19 pandemic. Many races were postponed or cancelled, while others were added to help fill the schedule. Justin Bonsignore, on the strength of 3 wins, won the championship. Jennerstown returned to the Tour for the first time in 2006, hosting two races, while New Hampshire's White Mountain Motorsports Park hosted back-to-back races that were the WMT's first ever visit to the beautiful bullring in White Mountains. 
	
6 time champion Doug Coby saw his Mike Smeriglio III Racing team close as Smeriglio chose to retire after a very successful career. Coby would form his own team in partnership with Steve Pickens, scoring one win at WMMP. Jon Mckennedy showed great speed on his way to second in points driving for Tommy Baldwin Racing, while Craig Lutz had a breakout year scoring wins at Jennerstown and Thompson.

2021 
	
2021 saw the WMT return to two popular southern venues in Martinsville Speedway and Richmond Raceway, as well as an additional race at both Oswego Speedway and Riverhead Raceway. Lancaster Raceway and Beech Ridge Motor Speedway also made their returns after long stretches without WMT races. Patrick Emerling proved a worthy competitor to Justin Bonsignore, as the two ran head to head right down to the wire at the final race of the season at Stafford Speedway. Bonsignore would celebrate a long awaited win at the storied CT race track as he clinched the 2021 title on the strength of 2 wins.
	
Cup series regular Ryan Preece would have a solid year, scoring wins at New Hampshire, Stafford, and Richmond. Tragically his car owner Eddie Partridge would pass away in the hours after the win at Richmond. The loss was huge for the modified racing community, as Partridge was one of the strongest supporters of modifieds over the years, fielding cars in many series, as well as saving the Riverhead Raceway.
	
Doug Coby made a bold move to miss the first race at Oswego to run in the inaugural Superstar Racing Experience race at Stafford - a move that proved fruitful as he would go on to beat the star studded field in front of a live national TV audience. The win parlayed Coby to his first career NASCAR Camping World Truck series start, scoring a 12th place finish at Bristol driving the GMS Racing 24 truck.
	
A large story line was the absence of any races at the fabled Thompson Speedway Motorsports Park. After being on the WMT schedule every year since the tours inception in 1985, the managing partners of the speedway decided to hold open tour type modified races instead. This did not prove popular amongst fans and teams alike, however TSMP returned to the WMT schedule for the 2022 season.

The cars

NASCAR Whelen Modified Tour cars are substantially different from their NASCAR Cup Series counterparts. Today's cars are based on tubular chassis built by fabricators such as Troyer Engineering, Chassis Dynamics, Spafco, Raceworks and Fury Race Cars / LFR Chassis. Bodies are related to their passenger car counterparts in only two ways. There is a "manufacturers" logo placed on the car, and a logo indicating the type of road car it is alleged to be. Neither logo is actually associated with the actual manufacturer of the race vehicle. Whelen Modified cars are also largely fabricated from sheetmetal, with the front wheels and much of the front suspension exposed. A NASCAR Whelen Modified car is  shorter in height and over  wider than a Cup car. On large tracks such as New Hampshire Motor Speedway, the engines must have a restrictor plate between the carburetor and intake manifold, reducing engine power and car speed for safety reasons. Approved "body styles" for 2006 include the Chevrolet Cavalier and Monte Carlo, the Dodge Avenger and Stealth, the Ford Mustang and Escort, the Plymouth Laser and Sundance, and the Pontiac Sunbird, J2000, and Grand Prix.

Safety
Richie Evans' 1985 death at Martinsville, along with other asphalt modified fatalities such as Charlie Jarzombek (in 1987), Corky Cookman (1987), Tommy Druar (1989), Don Pratt (1989), and Tony Jankowiak (1990), led to questions about car rigidity with tour modifieds, and safety changes.  In particular, straight frame rails were phased out, with new chassis required to have a step which could bend in hard impacts rather than passing the force to the driver.  The death of Tom Baldwin, Sr. in 2004 led to more safety modifications, with HANS devices (or equivalents) and left side headrests becoming mandatory. For the 2008 season, rear bumpers were shortened in response to the 2007 death of John Blewett III.

After a severed wheel caused a fatality at an Indy Racing League event at Lowe's Motor Speedway, NASCAR, in July 1999, required the Featherlite Modified Series teams (and eventually all NASCAR teams) to add steel cables as tethers linking each front spindle to the chassis, the steel cables were later replaced with marine rope which is stronger and weighs less.

Public stature
The series has been a minor league with a strong and loyal regional following.  Most national media attention has appeared in racing-centered publications (magazines such as Stock Car Racing Magazine and Speedway Illustrated, and newspapers such as National Speed Sport News and Speedway Scene) rather than general mass media.  In the 21st century, several books about historical modified drivers have been published. The series was featured in the EA Sports NASCAR series starting in NASCAR 2005: Chase for the Cup, though beginning with NASCAR 08, the series became exclusive to PlayStation 2 releases; additionally, all Whelen Modified Tour drivers in the aforementioned games (and NASCAR: Dirt to Daytona, the first video game to feature the series) are fictional characters specifically created for the games.

No full-time Cup Series driver competed regularly in Whelen Modified Tour events until 2010, when Ryan Newman won at Bristol and won twice at New Hampshire driving for Kevin Manion.  However, Ron Bouchard, Geoff Bodine, Brett Bodine, Steve Park, and Jimmy Spencer went on from WMT competition to become race winners at the Cup level.  Other WMT veterans such as Mike McLaughlin, and Jeff Fuller have advanced to become race winners and championship contenders in the Xfinity Series, the top minor league under the Cup Series. Two-time Xfinity Series champion Randy Lajoie also began racing modifieds in Connecticut before moving on the NASCAR. Cup Series crew chiefs that started in WMT include Tommy Baldwin Jr. and Greg Zipadelli.

In recent years, small numbers of races in the NASCAR Whelen Modified Tour have aired on network television, with none appearing on prime-time television. Since 2015, several races air on NBCSN on tape delay as part of NBC’s NASCAR contract that began that same year. with select events being live stream online on fanschoice.tv

The Modified Tour races with the Cup Series at the New Hampshire Motor Speedway in July (and is the feature division of their fall race weekend), and the STP 500 at Martinsville Speedway, where starting in 2020 they are the only support series, one of two Cup weekends (Sonoma the other) where no NASCAR national series events are part of the Cup weekend.  Typically, a name driver is recruited to participate in the race to pique the interest of casual fans.  For example, Cup Series driver Carl Edwards and defending Cup champion Tony Stewart raced in the July 2006 race. On August 19, 2009, the NASCAR Whelen Modified Tour made its debut at Bristol Motor Speedway as part of a four-series meet (with the three national series) that week. This was a combination event for the Whelen Modifieds and the Southern Whelen Modifieds, and part of the Camping World Truck Series race meet that evening.  The modifieds have also historically run with IndyCars when the IndyCar Series raced at Richmond International Raceway and New Hampshire Motor Speedway.

Notable drivers
Certain drivers are notable specifically for their NASCAR Whelen Modified Tour careers.

All-time top 10 drivers
The following drivers were named to the NASCAR Modified all-time top 10 list in 2003:
 Richie Evans – Evans won nine modified titles between 1973 and 1985, a championship total that was unmatched in all of NASCAR until Stefanik's championship in 2006; 52 wins in 84 NASCAR and unsanctioned events in 1979
 Mike Stefanik – seven WMT and two Busch North championships
 Jerry Cook – six NASCAR National Modified Championships in the 1970s, helped direct the series' changes as series director in 1985
 Ray Hendrick –  raced "anything, anywhere" from the 1950s to 1970s
 Geoff Bodine – in the Guinness Book of World Records for winning 55 modified races in 1978
 Tony Hirschman, Jr. – has won five WMT championships
 Bugs Stevens – won three consecutive NASCAR National Modified Championships, in 1967–69
 Fred DeSarro – 1970 NASCAR National Modified champion
 Jimmy Spencer – 1986 and 1987 WMT champion
 Reggie Ruggiero – the "best driver to never win a championship", his 44 victories rank him second to Stefanik since the modern era began in 1985

Wade Cole
Wade Cole (March 9, 1953 – March 15, 2020) was a fixture in the NASCAR Whelen Modified Tour. Between 1985 and 2019, Cole competed in 371 NWMT races, achieving 7 top ten finishes. He earned a career best eighth place finish twice, once in 1993 and again in 2008. His 371 starts place him eighth all time since the series inception in 1985. Cole died in a home accident on March 15, 2020. In 2020 a race on the tour was renamed for him.

Results

Champions
Click here for a list of all champions including 1948–84 National Modified champions.

Rookie of the Year

Most Popular Driver Award
NASCAR stopped awarding the Most Popular Driver Award in the Modified Tour from the 2017 season.

Pre-tour Most Popular Driver Award

Notes and references

See also

 NASCAR
 Whelen Southern Modified Tour
 NASCAR Regional Racing

External links

NASCAR official website
NASCAR's WMT page
Mod Series Scene website
2008 Whelen Modified Tour Schedule
YankeeRacer.com
History of Title sponsors
Fan site from 2002 
Archive.org image of www.petesracingsite.com – a fan site
Red Byron (first champ) bio on Living Legends of Auto Racing website
RacedayCT

NASCAR series
Auto racing series in the United States
Stock car racing
Stock car racing series in the United States
Whelen modified